Elton vs. Simon is a German remake of the Canadian show Kenny vs. Spenny.

Plot 
Like Kenny and Spenny, Elton and Simon are friends who share an apartment and fight each other in unusual competitions. The winner of a competition is allowed to think out some kind of unpleasant task called Bestrafung (Punishment) the loser has to perform. In Kenny vs. Spenny, this part is called "Humiliation".

Seasons 1 and 2 
Seasons 1 and 2 of Elton vs. Simon were very similar to the original format Kenny vs. Spenny. It had almost the same opening credits (only the heads of Kenny and Spenny were replaced with those of Elton and Simon) and most of the competition ideas were adopted from the original series. Like this, two seasons with a total of 15 episodes were produced and aired in 2005 and 2006.

Season 3 & 4 
In 2008 & 2010 a third and fourth season was produced. The concept of the series was slightly changed and it was renamed Elton vs. Simon - Die Live-Show. Instead of having one competition per episode, Elton and Simon had to do several mini-competitions. The first one to win four competitions was the overall winner. Some of the competitions and the punishment were performed in front of an audience.

Episode

Season 1  & 2

Season 3

aall motorists caught speeding in Germany are registered in Flensburg

References

External links 
 Official website 

2004 German television series debuts
2008 German television series endings
ProSieben original programming
German comedy television series
German-language television shows